is a Japanese manga series written by Tahiko Kimura. The manga was serialized between the September 2002 and May 2009 issues of Monthly Gangan Wing, and the June and December 2010 issues of Monthly Gangan Joker, both published by Square Enix. In 2004, a drama CD based on the series was released by Frontier Works. A 26-episode anime television series adaptation animated by Gonzo, directed by Seiji Kishi, and written by Makoto Uezu aired in Japan on TV Tokyo between April and September 2007. Two original video animation episodes were released in November 2008 and January 2009. Odex, a Singaporean distributor, released it in English in Singapore as Seto No Hana Yome. The anime was licensed for a North American distribution by Funimation Entertainment (now known as Crunchyroll) and was released in July and September 2010 under the title My Bride Is a Mermaid!.

Plot
The story of My Bride Is a Mermaid revolves around a young teenage boy named Nagasumi Michishio. One day during his summer vacation at the Seto Inland Sea, Nagasumi is saved from drowning by a mermaid named Sun Seto. Under mermaid law however, either the mermaid whose identity was revealed or the human who saw the mermaid must be executed. In an attempt to save both Nagasumi and Sun's lives, Sun's family (which is the head of a mermaid Yakuza group) reluctantly decides that the two are to be married. Sun's father Gōzaburō is enraged about his daughter's sudden marriage. Between Gōzaburō's constant attempts on his life and the madcap antics of a slew of antagonists, Nagasumi has a hard time transitioning into his new married lifestyle.

Characters
Some mermaid/merman characters are named for star (or planet) names and sea names.

Michishio family
 
 
 Nagasumi is the main protagonist of the series. Nagasumi is likely the only one in his family who has a clear head, apart from his grandmother. When push comes to shove, Nagasumi demonstrates a great deal of inner strength, and even has a "danger alert" mode, where the ahoge strand of hair on top of his head perks up and he exhibits the near-superhuman ability to dodge and evade practically anything or anyone that approaches him with ill intent. He decided to face his fears and take on the responsibility of taking care of Sun as his wife, although it does not make it easy on him due to the fact that almost everyone in the Seto group (except Sun's mother—Ren, and Masa) is against their union. As the series progresses, however, he truly falls in love with Sun. During the final episode of the anime, he confesses his love in front of her. Sun often uses her Song of Heroes to power Nagasumi up in battle situations, but in the case where Sun is directly threatened he is able to activate the power-up by himself. In the final chapter of the manga, Nagasumi almost drowned a second time and Sun saved him again, only this time he sincerely proposes to her after she gave her first kiss to him. At the end of the anime, Nagasumi coincidentally gained the appearance of a bulky strongman.

 
 
 Nagasumi's father is always shown as an object of suffering, due to his wife's dying love for him. Whenever his wife shows her interest in Masa, he is shown in a depressed state, like the time she offers Masa her home cooked meal, he is shown coughing on a burger and then subsequently harangued by his boss to get back to work. He was sitting at the table in the living room depressed because he felt like he was rejected by his family as he felt like they left him no food, but was told that he missed his chance of getting food because of him mumbling in a depressed state. When his wife falls for Nagasumi (because he took the love potion that makes him bear the face of a girl's dream man and Nagasumi's mom has a crush on Masa and she saw Nagasumi bear the face of Masa). He was sitting on the swing at a playground in a depressed state.
 
 
 Nagasumi's mother is the easy going type, and has an interest for Masa, which her husband is not particularly happy about. Current events in her life have caused her interest towards her husband to gradually die out, but overall she loves her family (including her husband) dearly. She also greatly enjoys having Sun and Lunar living with them, treating them like family as well as the "daughters" she never had.

 
 
 Nagasumi's paternal grandmother who lives near the Seto Inland Sea. She makes an appearance early in the story and allows Nagasumi to stay at her house during their stay with her. She does not appear again after the fourth episode of the anime. Nagasumi's family visit her once more as the manga concluded.

Seto family
 
 
 The female, mermaid protagonist of the story, Sun is the daughter of the yakuza Seto Group's boss Gōzaburō Seto. She is a firm believer in the chivalrous spirit of mermaids, and is devoted to her role as Nagasumi's wife. She is also in love with Nagasumi. Since she has yet to become an adult, Sun is unable to completely maintain her human form, and her legs revert to a tail whenever she comes into contact with water. When Sun enters chivalry mode, cherry blossom petals can be seen falling and the enka-style song  can be heard in the background. It is later revealed during Lunar and Nagasumi's wedding that if the need arises she can fight very well with a sword and also shows behavior much like a yakuza member. Her name is related to Seto Inland Sea and is a direct reference to the Sun. She has her own personal body guards but does not use them same way that Lunar does. They only show up on matters involving Lunar's personal body guards whom they (Sun's body guards) are constantly at war with. Because it is well known that cats are fond of meat, particularly fish, like most mermaids, she has a fear of cats (ailurophobia), but is capable of overcoming it if the circumstances require it.

 
 
 Gōzaburō is a sea dragon who is the boss of the Seto Group. He dotes on his daughter and hates Nagasumi for, as he sees it, trying to steal her away. By pulling strings at the ministry of education, Gōzaburō, together with many of the Seto Group members, enrolls in the staff of Nagasumi's junior-high school in order to watch over Sun, thus becoming Nagasumi and Sun's homeroom teacher. Even though he is the yakuza head of the Seto group as well as a powerfully built man with a formidable attitude, he has an overwhelming fear of cats (or kittens) due to an incident that happened in his childhood and a fear of his wife as she will not hesitate to hand out punishment.

 
 
 Ren is a mermaid who is Sun's mother. She likes to encourage Sun and Nagasumi. The most feared member of the Seto Group she usually tries to keep her husband and any other Seto Group members in check, often handing out extreme forms of punishment if they step out of line and has the final say on all matters. She also enjoys teasing Nagasumi, whom she thinks to be cute. She transfers with several other members of the Seto Group to Nagasumi's school, becoming the new school nurse. Like her daughter Sun when Ren enters chivalry mode pink flower petals can be seen falling and the song "Namida Ichirin" can be heard in the background. Ren on appearance is seen as a kind and gentle person but shows behavior much like a yakuza member. Her name  literally means lotus flower.

Seto Group members
 
 
 Masa is a member of the Seto Group and the kendo teacher of Sun. He has an afro and always wearing sunglasses. Masa is the one who, through performing CPR, "stole" Nagasumi's first kiss. He also transfers to Nagasumi's school, becoming his math teacher (whose word problems tend to describe to the mathematical aspects of underworld gang operations). There is a running gag of Nagasumi displaying an attraction towards Masa since their 'first kiss' in the first episode. Masa is the only one in the Seto clan apart from Sun's mother who does not object to the engagement and sometimes even gives advice to Nagasumi. Usually he is portrayed a silent man. However, when he drinks he tends to talk too much and reminisce. He is revealed later in the series to be the long-lost brother of Akeno Shiranui. He previously held the position his sister held but lost his memory after accidentally being struck in the head. Masa cares a lot for Akeno and is very protective of her often beating up those who are aggressive towards her. Akeno later learns Masa is her brother and with help from Nagasaki, they reconcile. He's one of the few Merfolk who isn't afraid of cats; he says that he decided to overcome the fear as a child.

 
 
 "Spiral Shell" (or "conch shell," in the anime) is a tiny assassin working for the Seto Group, as well a devoted friend of Sun. She uses a shell to shoot water balls as fast and powerful bullets and has a seemingly unlimited supply of ammunition. She, like Gōzaburō, dislikes the idea of "losing" Sun to Nagasumi, and will often distract Sun with sweet talk in order to fire her shell gun at Nagasumi. She thinks that Nagasumi and Lunar would be a much better match. She has a fear of cats (ailurophobia), but much to her dismay the cat at the Nagasumi's house has a liking to Maki and is often seen around her when Maki is not with Sun. She often refers to Nagasumi as a "sea louse".

 
 
 Shark is a member of Seto Group initially summoned by Sun's father during the Michishio family's initial visit to the Seto family home to attack Nagasumi. He has been with the Seto Clan since (and possibly before) Sun was a child. In human form, he later becomes Nagasumi's P.E. teacher. By his thinking, the sooner Nagasumi dies, the sooner everyone can return home. He often acts on this logic, trying to eat him. According to him, the answer to all problems is by eating the person causing the chaos, be it Sun's or Lunar's fans or a suicide bomber from his own group. He is often seen sleeping and unlike Kai Mikawa he has the ability to only transform his head into that of a shark while his legs remain human. No matter if he's asking a question or making a statement, he always sounds like he's asking a question.

 
 
 Nakajima is another member of the Seto Group and is actually a giant octopus. He too becomes a teacher at Nagasumi's school. Unlike the others, his human form is never shown in the entire anime. Most of the time he appears stuck inside the school due to his huge size. It's also shown that some of his tentacles are missing. Some scenes taking place in the cafeteria will show octopus being fed to the students.

Edomae family
 
 
 Lunar is a childhood friend and rival of Sun. She has used the powers of her mermaid voice to become an idol singer. She seems to suffer from a superiority complex, and she never passes up an attempt to overshadow Sun. She initially thought that Sun was boasting Nagasumi to her, and in an attempt to outdo Sun she decides to steal him away from her by making Nagasumi her servant, since Nagasumi has also seen her mermaid form. Later she decides to live in Nagasumi's house until his servant status is over. It was unclear if she has developed a liking to him (since she has decided to learn how to cook and make him a packed lunch, although still in an attempt to beat Sun). However, it is then revealed that she does in fact have feelings for Nagasumi, and planned on marrying him, but this is stopped by Sun, though she continues living with him even after her wedding is canceled. In the manga, Lunar accepts Nagasumi into her family during the commotion of the wedding; therefore, she is also technically married to Nagasumi. Sun accepts her decision and they both put an end to the war caused by Sun's interference. Lunar controls her own personal bodyguards made up of the boys of Isono Junior High school and she often calls them in to defend her, using them like her own personal army. They are currently at war with Sun's bodyguards. Lunar usually refers to herself in plural form ("us", "we", "our" and so on), and has a trademark "hohoho" laugh that can be heard before she enters the scene. She, like most other mermaids, has a fear of cats.

 
 
 President Edomae is Lunar's father and leader of the Edomae group (whereas the Seto group's holdings are in business, the Edomae group focuses in construction and real estate). Lunar's Papa is a man of very few words and is modeled after the Terminator. He is an extremely well built man (though in the manga he looks more thin), a point of humor in the show due to his body sounding like metal when hit. His actions are often direct references to the Terminator movies, such as sinking into an incinerator while giving a thumbs up and saying in English, "I'll be back". His appearance theme is a parody of the lead music score from the Terminator movie 'Judgment Day'. Despite his cold and unemotional appearance, he cares very much for his daughter and everything he can for her, though discreetly so. Unlike Gozaburo, he appears to be more accepting of the relationship between Nagasumi and Lunar. He is also extremely rich, as evidenced when he uses US$10 billion dollars (in cash) to fund a film that Lunar is in. He also has considerable influence in the ministry of education and is able to get into Nagasumi's school as a middle school student so he could get closer to Lunar. In the final episode, he is revealed to have laser eye beams. He is often seen in female school uniform, much to the disgust of Lunar.

 
 Lunar's mother and Lunar's Papa's ex-wife, prior to the divorce her last name was Edomae. Thought to have left the two when Lunar was five years-old due to losing her affection towards her husband, but in fact became a convict and spent ten years in prison because the crime of running over her clumsy husband - who had immersed himself in work without paying attention to her and their daughter - with a car. True nature is the same as Lunar and she finds a kindred spirit in her daughter when entering in this mode. Lunar became a pop idol partially due to a sense of rivalry with Sun caused by the above-mentioned nature, but her true feelings was that she wanted Amano to see her in the television. She played around with Lunar using the "war song" during the girl's childhood.

Other characters
 
 
 Mawari is the childhood friend of Nagasumi, whom she has a crush on, and is the daughter of the chief of police. She takes it upon herself to act as a moderator of social behavior, and often reprimands Nagasumi for his actions. Mawari's dream is to become a police chief like her father. Nagasumi says her personality is similar to Sun's which shocks Sun. Her name is related to Zenigata Heiji and "Omawari-san" (a gentle and polite way to say policeman in Japanese). One thing of interest is that whenever Mawari speaks or does something related to peacekeeping, a police whistle can be heard in the background. She is referred to as the queen of cards at Isumo elementary school due to her having won two championships at the Isumo elementary school first year student's card game tournament with Nagasumi as her partner. She is a member of the disciplinary committee and is the leader of the Public Morals Committee/Peacemakers which is a group formed by the girls of Isono Junior High School; the group is Isono Junior High's Police and is the biggest of the three groups, they can take on both Sun and Luna's group at the same time, they are at war with both Sun and Lunar's personal body guards. Due to Mawari's police background she is able to see through the lies that any of her school member make, she often gets close to finding out the fact that Sun is a mermaid but gets stopped by Nagasumi before she does. She also has a trade mark line,  (English dub: "Maybe I should teach you something about the rules of this society!"); she says this when people break her rules.

 
 
 Hideyoshi Sarutobi, often referred to as Saru (or Chimp in the English dub), is a friend of Nagasumi who is often portrayed as a perverted monkey (a pun on his name; "saru" meaning monkey). He later became Kai Mikawa's "servant" and always protects and helps him when he is in need. In the beginning, Saru's reasons for befriending Mikawa are because of his fortune; However, in episode 24 it is shown Saru genuinely cares for Mikawa. His name is related to Sarutobi Sasuke (a trait when he is Mikawa's servant of appearing out of nowhere is also related to Sarutobi Sasuke) and Toyotomi Hideyoshi (who himself was also often called "Saru/Monkey"). Saru occasionally appears dressed as a bearded old man in a robe, "ero-sennin" (English dub: the Pervy Hermit), who periodically appears to Nagasumi to offer insights of perverted sagacity. When in the old hermit form he calls himself "Saru Roshi" (English dub: Chimp Roshi) a parody of Master Roshi from Dragon Ball.

 
 
 She is a good friend of Mawari and a meganekko. Her true name is unknown as her classmates only refer her as the Class Rep. Despite the fact that she is the class rep, her presence is usually too passive to be noticeable. She later reveals that she has very strong feelings for Nagasumi. Later, she writes a love letter to Nagasumi, to confess her love, but accidentally confesses to Sun due to not looking at the person she was confessing to. This event leads to the sudden creation of an alternate persona, the "Last Amazoness", a girl-loving warrior who declares her intent to have Sun as her own. The Class Rep uses this persona when she's trying to get noticed or when she needs extra confidence. In recent volumes of the manga, the Last Amazoness takes an active role in fighting troublemakers after receiving a gender-reversing mermaid weapon, the magical bow that fires an arrow of light that never misses its target (though the projectile itself could be blocked by another organic being) called "Gender-X", from Saturn. The Class Rep also works with Maki on occasion, believing her to be a fairy, her desire is for people to find out her real name. The last page of the last volume of the manga reveals that her name is Iina Chiyo.

 
 
 Kai Mikawa is the fourteen-year-old son of the head of the multi-million dollar Mikawa Corporation. He rivals Nagasumi for Sun's hand in marriage, and tends to resort to measures that often put Nagasumi's well-being in question (i.e. in the anime, he skyrocketed an over-sized, rampaging Nagasumi, resulting in the latter's brief exile to the moon, from where Mikawa later ordered to be bombarded by missiles fired from his Corporation's private satellite). He is a killer whale from another mermaid group. Strangely while Sun and Lunar are shown in Mermaid form (torso of a human and tail of a fish) whenever they fail to maintain their human forms, Mikawa is shown as an entire killer whale when he succumbs to the effect of water. He also has agoraphobia, which is why he travels only in submarines and wears an astronaut's suit in open spaces; depriving him of either while out in the open is enough to put him into a state of panic that he's willing to bribe the first willing person to assist him in any way. While looking for a servant he befriends Saru. Mikawa, like most merfolk, has a fear of cats (ailurophobia). He is usually seen in a Japanese navy uniform, but wears his astronaut suit when he's out in the open, and carrying a katana. He is the leader of Sun's bodyguards. In a flashback, he used to hate the fact that people only sucked up to him because of his status and wealth when they were kids, but he now uses it to get people to do whatever he wants, such as earning the never-ending support of Saru (something that Sun does not like).

 
 
 Akeno is not only a mermaid, but also a "mermaid examiner". She has the responsibility of deporting all the mer-people who fail to qualify as not only resembling humans but also not arousing any suspicion of their true identities; and unlike the other mermaids in the cast, Akeno is capable of suppressing her mermaid transformation, for brief moments, after coming into contact with water, having trained herself to do so. When first introduced she had a hostile attitude towards the other major protagonists. This later changes as she develops feelings of compassion towards them and also as she finds her "duty" as a knight-in-training as an excuse used by the final antagonist. It is also revealed that she is, in fact, Masa's younger sister, a fact which she is unaware of. She is terrified of ghosts and is hinted that she has feelings for Nagasumi. Akeno discovered Masa is her brother when seeing his old appearance after he had gotten a perm, and she attacks him in rage until Nagasumi and Sun calm her down that Masa did not mean to abandon her and they make up.

 Yoshiuo Minamoto
 
 The final antagonist of the anime. He is a wealthy aristocrat, referred as a "noble" in the dub, who had secretly caused the disappearance of several girls who were invited to parties he hosted. He was the employer of Akeno and gave her orders to break up Nagasumi and Sun so he could have her for himself, though his reasons were based only on finding Sun physically attractive. Though he claims to be a "mermaid noble", his speaking and mannerisms are similar to that of a punk (such as referring to Sun as a "babe" or calling Nagasumi a "drag"). His true form is a repulsive and overweight catfish, something his loyal followers had been unaware of and find hilarious after his true form is revealed upon losing his fight with Nagasumi. He has three giant, carnivorous eels as pets.

 
 
 Saru's little sister who appears in the original manga and the OVA series. After being saved from a burning movie theatre by Nagasumi, she calls him "Nagasumi Willis" after "Bunta Willis" an action hero that parodies Bruce Willis and Bunta Sugawara. She develops feelings for Nagasumi.

 
 
 A childhood friend of Sun, Saturn is a seaweed creature whose hair allows her to cling to ceilings and entangles objects in the water. Her hair can act as weapon to strangle opponents, and sometimes unwillingly trap a lot of things usually found in water, from fish to sea garbage and even people. Lack of water is something she cannot handle. She becomes an English teacher at Sun's junior high school in volume nine of the manga. She appeared in the second OVA (Gi).

 
A delinquent terrorizing the main character's school. He heads a small group of bullies who were first seen harassing Mawari, but were stopped by the Class President in her Last Amazoness guise, by turning them all into females using the "Gender X" bow supplied by Saturn. Tennōzan is related to  but can also mean 'a place of a crucial battle'.

 
 Alias: Jupiter. Member of the Weapon Attack Team and executive officer at Isono Junior High school. Jupiter is a friend of Akeno whom she refers to as "Onee-sama" and has romantic feelings for.

 
 Maki's younger sister. She is garbed in a similar manner to character Kororo from Shaman King. Uses a fuki leaf instead of a shell for her attacks and uses ice that can freeze her targets. Fuki is the bodyguard of Maruko.

 
 Yet another childhood friend of Sun. She dresses up as a nun. Her voice powers allow her to mind control people and cancel other mermaid's singing powers. She initially came to kill Nagasumi, believing he forced Sun to marry. However, she made peace with him when Nagasumi helped save her from her internal bleeding problem.

Media

Manga
The My Bride Is a Mermaid manga series was serialized between the September 2002 and May 2009 issues of the Japanese manga magazine Monthly Gangan Wing, and the June and December 2010 issues of Monthly Gangan Joker, both published by Square Enix. Sixteen tankōbon were released in Japan.

Anime

The anime TV series adaptation directed by Seiji Kishi, written by Makoto Uezu and produced by Gonzo and AIC aired in Japan on TV Tokyo between April 1 and September 30, 2007, containing 26 episodes. Episode 17 of the anime adaptation scheduled for broadcast on the Japanese cable network Anime Theater X on September 3, 2007 was canceled due to concerns of copyright infringement. Some of the characters who appear in that episode are believed to closely resemble characters from other works. The series was licensed by Funimation and was released under the title My Bride Is a Mermaid!. The first of two parts was released on July 20, 2010.
Three pieces of theme music were used for the anime: one opening theme, and two ending themes. The opening theme is "Romantic Summer" by Sun (Haruko Momoi) & Lunar (Sakura Nogawa), which was written, composed, and arranged by Halko Momoi. In the opening video, the characters dancing behind Sun change depending on the episode whether it is dedicated or related to them (for example, Nagasumi dancing with the Seto's Special Squad brothers). In the video, the image in the ending changes slightly between each episode as new characters are introduced in the anime. The second ending theme, used for episodes fourteen through twenty-five, is "Dan Dan Dan" by Sun (Haruko Momoi) & Lunar (Sakura Nogawa), which was written by Gorō Matsui, and composed and arranged by Shūhei Naruse. In the video, the characters' animations change depending on the circumstances they undergo during the episode (for example, the Class President transforming into "Yes! Amazoness!").

OVA
An original video animation episode entitled  was released on November 28, 2008, along with the OVA ending theme single,  by Dekabancho. The OVA's opening theme single,  by Sun&Lunar, was released on October 29, 2008. A second OVA entitled  was released on January 30, 2009, along with its ending theme,  by Sun&Lunar. The opening theme for this OVA,  by Haruko Momoi, Sakura Nogawa, Rika Morinaga, Eri Kitamura, was released on December 24, 2008.

Notes

References

External links
 Official anime website 
 Official anime website at TV Tokyo 
 Official anime website at Gonzo 
 Official anime website at Avex Group 
 

2002 manga
2007 anime television series debuts
2008 anime OVAs
Anime International Company
Fiction about mermaids
Funimation
Gangan Comics manga
Gonzo (company)
Harem anime and manga
Marriage in anime and manga
Odex
Paranormal romance comics
Romantic comedy anime and manga
School life in anime and manga
Shōnen manga
Television shows written by Makoto Uezu
TV Tokyo original programming
Yakuza in anime and manga